Zah or ZAH may refer to:

 Zah (name), list of people with the name
 Ẓāʼ (Arabic: ﻅ), a letter of the Arabic alphabet
 Zahedan International Airport, Iran
 The Center of Astronomy (University of Heidelberg)